The 1983 U.S. Women's Open was the 38th U.S. Women's Open, held July 28–31 at Cedar Ridge Country Club in Broken Arrow, Oklahoma, a suburb southeast of Tulsa.

In oppressive heat, Jan Stephenson won her third and final major championship with a score of 290 (+6), a stroke ahead of runners-up JoAnne Carner and 

The low amateur was 18-year-old Heather Farr of Phoenix, who tied for eleventh place

Past champions in the field

Made the cut

Source:

Missed the cut

Source:

Final leaderboard
Sunday, July 31, 1983

Source:

References

External links
Golf Observer final leaderboard
U.S. Women's Open Golf Championship
Cedar Ridge Country Club

U.S. Women's Open
Golf in Oklahoma
Sports competitions in Oklahoma
Broken Arrow, Oklahoma
Women's sports in Oklahoma
U.S. Women's Open
U.S. Women's Open
U.S. Women's Open